Ferdinand is a Germanic name composed of  the  elements  "protection",  "peace" (PIE  "to love, to make peace") or alternatively  "journey, travel", Proto-Germanic , abstract noun from root  "to fare, travel" (PIE , "to lead, pass over"), and  "courage" or   "ready, prepared" related to Old High German  "to risk, venture."

The name was adopted in Romance languages from its use in the Visigothic Kingdom. It became popular in German-speaking Europe only from the 16th century, with Habsburg rule over Spain.

There are numerous short forms in many languages, such as the Finnish .

There is a feminine Spanish, Portuguese and Italian form, .

Royalty

Aragón/León/Castile/Spain 
Ferdinand I of Aragon (1380–1416) the Just, King in 1412
Ferdinand II of Aragon (1452–1516) the Catholic, King in 1478
Ferdinand I of León (1015–1065) the Great, King of León and Castile in 1037
Ferdinand II of León (1137–1188), King of León in 1157
Ferdinand III of Castile (1199–1252) the Saint, King of Castile in 1217 and of León in 1230
Ferdinand IV of Castile (1285–1312) the Summoned, King of Castile in 1295 and of León in 1301
Ferdinand V of Castile (1452–1516) the Catholic – see Ferdinand II of Aragon
Ferdinand VI of Spain (1713–1759) the Learned, King of Spain in 1746
Ferdinand VII of Spain (1784–1833), twice King of Spain: 1808 and 1813–1833
Cardinal-Infante Ferdinand of Austria (1618–1641)

Portugal 
Ferdinand I of Portugal the Handsome (1345–1383), King in 1367
Ferdinand II of Portugal (1816–1885), second husband of Queen Maria II
Ferdinand, Count of Flanders (1188–1233), son of King Sancho I
Ferdinand the Holy Prince (1402–1443), youngest son of King John I
Ferdinand, Duke of Viseu (1433–1470), 2nd Duke of Viseu and 1st Duke of Beja, King Manuel's father
Ferdinand of Portugal, Duke of Guarda (1507–1534), 3rd son of King Manuel I of Portugal

Austria and German states 
Ferdinand I, Holy Roman Emperor (1503–1564), Emperor in 1556
Ferdinand II, Archduke of Austria (1529–1595), Governor in the Kingdom of Bohemia in Prague (1547–1567) and sovereign of Tyrol and Further Austria (1564–1595), in Innsbruck since 1567
Ferdinand II, Holy Roman Emperor (1578–1637), Emperor in 1619
Ferdinand III, Holy Roman Emperor (1608–1657), King of Hungary and Croatia, King of Bohemia and Archduke of Austria
Ferdinand I of Austria (1793–1875), Emperor of Austria in 1835
Ferdinand of Bavaria (1577–1650) Prince-elector archbishop of Cologne, prince-bishop of Hildesheim, Liège, Münster, and Paderborn
Ferdinand of Fürstenberg (1626–1683) Prince Bishop of Paderborn and Münster.
Ferdinand, Duke of Brunswick (1721–1792)
Ferdinand Zvonimir von Habsburg (1997), Archduke of Austria, Grandson to late Otto von Habsburg of Austria

Italian states

Naples, Sicily and the Two Sicilies 
Ferdinand I of Naples (1423–1494), King in 1458
Ferdinand II of Naples (1469–1496), King in 1495
Ferdinand III of Naples – see Ferdinand II of Aragon
Ferdinand IV of Naples – see Ferdinand I of the Two Sicilies
Ferdinand I of Sicily – see Ferdinand I of Aragon
Ferdinand II of Sicily – see Ferdinand II of Aragon
Ferdinand III of Sicily – see Ferdinand I of the Two Sicilies 
Ferdinand I of the Two Sicilies (1751–1825)
Ferdinand II of the Two Sicilies (1810–1859), King from 1830 to 1859

Mantua and Montferrat 
Ferdinand or Ferdinando Gonzaga, Duke of Mantua (1587–1626), Duke in 1612 
Ferdinand or Ferdinando Carlo Gonzaga, Duke of Mantua and Montferrat (1652–1708), Duke in 1665

Parma 
Ferdinand of Parma (1751–1802), Duke in 1765

Tuscany 
Ferdinand III, Grand Duke of Tuscany (1769–1824), Grand Duke in 1790
Ferdinand IV, Grand Duke of Tuscany (1835–1908), Grand Duke from 1859 to 1860

Bulgaria 
Ferdinand I of Bulgaria (1861–1948), knyaz (prince) 1887–1908, tsar (emperor) 1908–1918

Romania 
Ferdinand I of Romania (1865–1927), became King 1914

Denmark 
 Ferdinand, Hereditary Prince of Denmark (1792–1863)

Other people 
Ferdinand Lewis Alcindor Jr., American basketball player who changed his name to Kareem Abdul-Jabbar
Fernando Alonso (born 1981), Spanish racing driver
Ferdinand Bol (1616–1680), Dutch Golden Age painter
Fernand Braudel (1902–1985), French historian
Ferdinand de Rothschild (1839–1898), British banker
Ferdinand Budicki (1871–1951), Croatian automotive pioneer
Ferdinand Porsche (1875–1951), German automotive engineer and founder of Porsche
Ferd Burket (born 1933), American football player
Ferdinand Coly (born 1973), Senegalese footballer
Ferdinand Dennis (born 1956), Jamaican-born writer and broadcaster 
Ferd Dreher (1913–1996), American football player
Ferdinand Fabra (1906–2007), German football manager
Ferdinand Foch (1851–1929), French marshal, Allied Supreme Commander in World War I
Ferd Hayward (1911–1988), Canadian racewalker
Ferran Hurtado (1951–2014), Spanish mathematician and computer scientist
Ferdinand van Ingen (born 1933), Dutch Germanist
Ferdinand Jodl (1896–1956), German World War II general, brother of Alfred Jodl
Ferd Johnson (1905–1996), American cartoonist
Ferdinand Kozovski (1892–1965), Bulgarian politician and general
Ferdinand Joseph LaMothe, better known as Jelly Roll Morton (1890–1941), American self-styled inventor of jazz
Ferdinand de Lesseps (1805–1894), French developer of the Suez Canal
Ferdinand Magellan (1480–1521), Portuguese sea captain (serving Spain), leader of first expedition to sail around the world
Ferdinand Marcos (1917–1989), Tenth president of the Philippines
Ferdinand "Thirdy" Ravena III (born 1996), Filipino basketball player

Ferdinand Rudolph Hassler (1770-1845, Swiss-American surveyor
Ferdinand Sauerbruch (1875–1951), German surgeon 
Ferdinand de Saussure (1857–1913), Swiss linguist
Ferran Torres (born 2000), Spanish footballer
Ferd Wirtz (1885–1947), Luxembourgian gymnast
Ferdinand von Zeppelin (1838–1917), German airship mogul
Ferdinand Mannlicher (1848–1904), Austrian firearms designer
Ferdinand Zylka (born 1998), German basketball player

Fictional characters
Ferdinand von Aegir, a character from the video game Fire Emblem: Three Houses
Ferdinand Griffon, main character played by Jean-Paul Belmondo in the movie Pierrot le fou
Ferdinand Vaněk, a vaguely autobiographical character in several plays by the Czech playwright Václav Havel
Ferdinand, a character in William Shakespeare's play The Tempest
Ferdinand the Bull, a mild mannered bull in the children's book The Story of Ferdinand
Ferdinand the Bull, mascot of the Taranaki Rugby Football Union team
Ferdinand, a character from the television series Thomas & Friends
Dr. Ferdinand, a character from the manga Steel Ball Run
Ferdinand, a character from the action-adventure game L.A. Noire

See also 
Ferd (nickname)
Ferdy, a list of people and fictional characters named or nicknamed Ferdy or Ferdie
Ferdinand Porsche (disambiguation)
Ferdinando (disambiguation)
Fernand (disambiguation)
Fernando
Fernández
Hernández

Germanic given names
German masculine given names
Bulgarian masculine given names
French masculine given names
Romanian masculine given names

es:Fernando